Pule Isaac Thole is a South African advocate and former SAPS brigadier who served as a Member of the Northern Cape Provincial Legislature for the Democratic Alliance from 2014 to 2016.

Biography
Thole served as a brigadier in the South African Police Service until his election to the Northern Cape Provincial Legislature in May 2014. He was one of seven Democratic Alliance members. Thole was the party's spokesperson on  transport, safety and liaison.

In January 2016, Thole announced his resignation from the DA. His resignation came into effect in mid-March. The DA appointed Melinda Hattingh to fill his seat in the legislature.

References

External links

Living people
Year of birth missing (living people)
Tswana people
Members of the Northern Cape Provincial Legislature
Democratic Alliance (South Africa) politicians